Sione Lousi (born 8 October 1989) is a New Zealand professional rugby league footballer who plays for the Townsville Blackhawks in the Queensland Cup. He has played in the National Rugby League (NRL) for the New Zealand Warriors.

Background
He is the brother of Sam Lousi.

Early years
Lousi attended St Paul's College, a school known for its rugby league sides. From here he played for the Bay Roskill Vikings and Richmond Bulldogs in the Auckland Rugby League competition and joined the New Zealand Warriors Allied Workforce development squad.

Playing career
With the creation of the Toyota Cup in 2008 Lousi joined the Warriors under-20 side. In 2009 he played in 17 games for the side and trained with the senior squad in the 2010 pre-season, playing in all three trials. He finished his Toyota Cup career with thirty three appearances and two tries.

Lousi made his first grade debut in Round One of the 2010 season.

In 2010 Lousi was selected for the Tongan side, playing one test against Samoa.

He was released by the Warriors at the end of the 2016 season and joined the Townsville Blackhawks in the Queensland Cup.

References

External links
New Zealand Warriors Profile
Richmond Rovers Profile

1989 births
Living people
Auckland rugby league team players
Bay Roskill Vikings players
New Zealand rugby league players
New Zealand sportspeople of Tongan descent
New Zealand Warriors players
Richmond Bulldogs players
Rugby league players from Auckland
Rugby league second-rows
People educated at St Paul's College, Auckland
Tonga national rugby league team players
Townsville Blackhawks players